Captain Adam Henry Bogardus (1834–1913) was a world champion and United States champion trap shooter, as well as the inventor of the first practical glass ball trap.

He was born in Berne, New York. There, in 1854, he married Cordelia Dearstyne. They moved to Elkhart, Illinois where he became the wing shot champion of the world. He is credited with romanticizing trap shooting.

Trap shooting with live pigeons began in the U.S. around 1825, with the first recorded match balls containing feathers, then clay targets. Bogardus invented the first practical glass ball trap in 1877. Glass spheres, filled with feathers, were used as targets, much as clay pigeons are used today. They were called Bogardus balls. One feature of them was ridges which helped ensure that pellets would shatter the sphere, rather than glancing off.

In 1883 William Frank Carver defeated Bogardus 19 times in a series of 25 matches.

Bogardus and his sons went on to tour with Buffalo Bill's Wild West show. Captain Bogardus remained with the show for a year.

Bogardus is in the National Trapshooting Hall of Fame. He died in 1913 in Lincoln, Logan Co., Illinois and is buried in Elkhart, Illinois.

References

External links 
 Capt. A. H. Bogardus Trap & Field, December 2000
 American Heritage Magazine, April 1962, Volume 13, Issue 3
 National Trapshooting Hall of Fame
 

1834 births
1913 deaths
Sharpshooters
Wild West show performers
People from Berne, New York
People from Elkhart, Illinois